Pyropyga is a genus of primarily North American fireflies in the beetle family Lampyridae. There are about 13 described species in Pyropyga. It is among the genera of Lampyridae where both sexes of adults have no bioluminescent organs.

Species
 Pyropyga alticola Green, 1961
 Pyropyga australis Green, 1961
 Pyropyga chemsaki Zaragoza-Caballero, 1993
 Pyropyga cordobana Green, 1961
 Pyropyga decipiens (Harris, 1836)
 Pyropyga extensa Green, 1961
 Pyropyga incognita E. Olivier, 1912
 Pyropyga minuta (LeConte, 1852)
 Pyropyga modesta Green, 1961
 Pyropyga nigricans (Say, 1823)
 Pyropyga saltensis Green, 1961

Nomina dubia
 Pyropyga exstincta (Gorham, 1880)
 Pyropyga tarda Motschulsky, 1854

References

Further reading

External links

 

Lampyridae
Lampyridae genera
Articles created by Qbugbot